William "Bill" G. Allman (born 1952) is an American politician who was the seventh White House Curator, first appointed by President George W. Bush. He served as both the head of the White House Office of the Curator and as a spokesperson for the office's initiatives.

Early life
Allman was born in Bethesda, Maryland. He received a Bachelor of Arts in History from the University of Maryland and a Master of Arts in American Studies with Museum Concentration from The George Washington University.

White House
Allman joined the White House as a Curatorial Assistant and was promoted to Assistant Curator in 1976. He contributed extensively to the 1999 revised and expanded second edition of Official White House China by Margaret Klapthor and also authored the catalog section of The White House: Its Historic Furnishings & First Families by Betty C. Monkman in 2000. Allman was appointed White House Curator on August 1, 2002. He has also written for the journal White House History and has given lectures on the White House collection.

References

External links

Living people
George W. Bush administration personnel
Obama administration personnel
Trump administration personnel
White House Curators
1952 births